Blackrock railway station was on the Cork, Blackrock and Passage Railway in County Cork, Ireland.

History

The station opened on 8 June 1850.

Passenger services were withdrawn on 12 September 1932.

Routes

Further reading

References

Disused railway stations in County Cork
Railway stations opened in 1850
Railway stations closed in 1932

Railway stations in the Republic of Ireland opened in 1850